Beta Phoenicis (β Phoenicis, β Phe) is a binary star in the constellation Phoenix. Its apparent magnitude is 3.30, meaning that it can be seen with the naked eye (see Bortle scale).

The distance to Beta Phoenicis is poorly known. The original reduction of the Hipparcos satellite's data yielded a parallax value of 16 milliarcseconds, yet its standard error was larger than the parallax value itself. The new reduction of the Hipparcos data gave 0.12 ± 14.62 milliarcseconds, still unusable.

Beta Phoenicis is a relatively wide visual binary consisting of two G-type giant stars, both with spectral types of G8III. The two orbit each other every 170.7 years and have a relatively eccentric orbit. The stars are separated by almost one arcsecond.

References

G-type giants
Binary stars
Phoenix (constellation)
Phoenicis, Beta
Durchmusterung objects
006595
005165
0322